Grand Forks, population 4,112, is a city in the Boundary Country of the West Kootenay region of British Columbia, Canada. It is located at the confluence of the Granby and Kettle Rivers, a tributary of the Columbia River.

History
In 1894, a new settlement at the North Fork bridge, where the rivers join, was called Grand Forks. However, the valley, dominated by copper mining, was called Grand Prairie, and early settlers equally used that name for the town. The city was laid out in 1895 and Grand Forks was established as a city on 15 April 1897. The adjacent City of Columbia was incorporated on 4 May 1899. By 1902, Grand Forks had three railways, lumber mills, a smelter, mines, a post office, a school and a hospital. The railways servicing Grand Forks were the Canadian Pacific Railway's (CP) Columbia and Western Railway, the Kettle River Valley Railway, and the Great Northern Railway (GNR). Grand Forks and Columbia amalgamated in 1903, but only after lengthy disagreements over an acceptable name. In 1907, it was the home of a local branch of the Western Federation of Miners.

In 1908 and 1911, the downtown core was affected by a fire, because of wood-frame buildings and stores. Between the years of 1909 and 1913, a group of pacifist Russian immigrants known as Doukhobors settled in the area because of the fertile farm land. Today, many residents of Grand Forks are descendants of the Doukhobors. In 1991, CP decommissioned their railway line through Grand Forks, and the former right-of-way became part of the Trans Canada Trail. The Kettle Falls International Railway, the only remaining operator, which services the former GN route, plans to decommission the line north of Laurier, Washington by 2023. Grand Forks has been promoting industrial growth, which has been declining since the early 2000s. Over time, Grand Forks has gradually expanded in population and now has 4,049 residents within its city limits. The greater rural area, (Area D of the Regional District of Kootenay-Boundary), has another ~3,500 residents.

In May 2018 Grand Forks, and the Boundary region as a whole, were affected by flooding of the Kettle and Granby Rivers. Low-lying areas, including part of the downtown core, saw extensive damage. The Ruckle neighborhood was most affected. The federal government is expected to buy out all the homes in North Ruckle and turn the area back into a natural flood plain.

Government
The City of Grand Forks has a seven-person elected council, with Everett Baker currently serving as mayor.
The incumbent councillors are: Zak Eburne-Stoodley, Neil Krog, Christine Thompson, David Mark, Deborah Lafleur and Rod Zielinski. Provincially, Grand Forks is located in the constituency of Boundary-Similkameen, where it is represented by MLA Roly Russell and federally it is located in the South Okanagan—West Kootenay riding and represented by MP Richard Cannings.

Demographics

Ethnicity

Religion 
According to the 2021 census, religious groups in Grand Forks included:
Irreligion (2,390 persons or 61.4%)
Christianity (1,315 persons or 33.8%)
Sikhism (40 persons or 1.0%)
Hinduism (30 persons or 0.8%)
Buddhism (20 persons or 0.5%)
Islam (10 persons or 0.3%)
Other (75 persons or 1.9%)

Schools
Schools in the region are operated by School District 51 Boundary which has its main office in Grand Forks and also serves Midway, Greenwood, Beaverdell, and Rock Creek.

There are two elementary (Dr. D. A. Perley Elementary School, and John A. Hutton Elementary School) and one secondary school (Grand Forks Secondary School). The District also operates an alternate learning centre in Grand Forks (Walker Development Centre).

Selkirk College, based in Castlegar, has a community campus in Grand Forks. Established in 1966, Selkirk College is BC's oldest community college. Students that study in Grand Forks have access to a variety of courses at both the High School and College level.

Industry
Major industries in Grand Forks are limited and have become smaller over the past decade with the loss of major industries, such as Pope & Talbot, the industries in Grand Forks are logging, agriculture, rock wool manufacturing, fabrication (metal) and tourism. The city is close to the site of the former Phoenix copper mine, which closed in 1935. The slag piles on the Granby River just outside town are remnants of a large copper smelting operation. The sawmill in Grand Forks is operated by Interfor (formerly Pope and Talbot) and ships forest products into the United States via rail. Tourism has declined in Grand Forks due to a lack of tourist attractions. However, it is in close proximity to the Okanagan, which is a large tourist destination. Christina Lake, which is 20 minutes east of Grand Forks, is home to many resorts and summer homes and its year round population of 1,000 increases to 6,000 during the Summer. The slag from the piles at the north end of town is owned by Pacific Abrasives, who sells it to the US Navy and ships it by rail to San Diego, California to use for sandblasting ships.

Transportation
The short-line Grand Forks Railway is based out of Grand Forks. The company owns  of track, which connects Roxul and Interfor with the Grand Forks Junction at the south end of town. It is the shortest railway in Canada. Train cars then get sent to the United States via the Kettle Falls International Railway.

The city is also served by the Grand Forks Airport.

Climate
Grand Forks experiences a humid continental climate (Köppen climate classification Dfb) with a similar climate to the Okanagan Valley to the west. However, the Boundary area usually receives slightly colder and snowier winters and slightly hotter summer temperatures, due to its location away from large lakes. Daytime highs during the summer often top  and surpass  at least once every few years. Night temperatures often fall rapidly in summer, and frost is rare but not unheard of in June or September. Winter temperatures are moderately (seldom severely) cold, but definitely mild by Canadian standards. Some years may see only a few light snowfalls and intermittent snow cover, whereas others receive several large snowstorms and snow cover from December to March. Precipitation is higher than many other drier Southern Interior locations, but still fairly low.

The primary vegetation in the Grand Forks area is typical of the Southern BC dry belt. Sagebrush, bunchgrass, prickly pear cactus, arrowleaf balsamroot, ponderosa pine and douglas-fir dominate the valley bottom and south facing slopes. More mountainous species such as bearberry, lodgepole pine, western larch, Engelmann spruce, western red cedar and black cottonwood can be found along the Kettle and Granby Rivers and on north facing slopes.

Sports

Notable residents
 Ron Areshenkoff
 Vasily Balabanov
 Bill Barlee (1932–2012), politician, minister of small business, tourism and culture of British Columbia.
 Martin Burrell (1858–1938), politician, member of the Canadian Parliament.
Xiomara De Oliver (born 1967), painter.
 Edward Dmytryk (1908–1999), Hollywood film director.
 Chris Loseth
 Ted Reynolds
 Brian Taylor

Freedom of the City
The following people and military units have received the Freedom of the City of Grand Forks.

Individuals
 Jock and Betty Ann McKay 14 Sept 2011
 Les Johnson: 20 July 2020
 Larry Seminoff: 15 July 2022.
 Gerry Foster: 15 July 2022.

See also
 Hardy Mountain Doukhobor Village
 Grand Forks Gazette
 Vancouver, Victoria and Eastern Railway
 Columbia and Western Railway
 Cascade City, British Columbia

Notes

References

External links

Cities in British Columbia
Populated places in the Boundary Country